Mountain Warfare Training Camp Michael Monsoor (formerly known as La Posta Mountain Warfare Training Facility) in San Diego County, California is a  training facility used by the Naval Special Warfare Center.

History
The  site has a firing range, an administration building, barracks, and a  length mountain endurance training course. The navy has operated on the  plus acres since the early 1960s, and is seeking to set aside an additional  of federal Bureau of Land Management property for the facility. The Mountain Warfare Training Facility served as a satellite tracking station until it was shut down in 1986. The property was reconfigured as a training center and named for Master-at-Arms Second Class Petty Officer Michael A. Monsoor, a member of SEAL Team 3, who died during the Iraq War in 2006. He was awarded the Medal of Honor posthumously.

Operations
In 1998, Naval Base Coronado gave permission for the Naval Special Warfare Command to use the site for mountain warfare training of the Naval Special Warfare Group One which trains its SEAL and SDV teams there, and conducts BUD/S classes. The La Posta Navy Mountain Warfare Training Facility plays a critical role in military training because the area's land and terrain closely resemble the environments found in Korea and parts of Iraq and Afghanistan. Its close proximity to most military bases in San Diego County allows for maximum training time with limited travel time and expense for its Group One. The unencumbered area around La Posta and its proximity to the Laguna Mountains makes it an ideal location for special reconnaissance training, map and compass training, and other specialized special warfare training. Camp Michael Monsoor, like San Clemente Island, is one of the few places that allow special forces to train in a real life environment with limited encroachment problems.

See also
 List of mountain warfare forces
Mountain Warfare Training Center (United States Marine Corps)
Northern Warfare Training Center (United States Army)
Russian Hatsavita Mountain Warfare Training (Russia)
Mountain Leader Training Cadre (UK)
High Mountain Military School (France)
High Altitude Warfare School (India)

References

 Cliff Hollenbeck, Dick Couch, To Be A U.S. Navy Seal, Zenith Imprint, 2003

External links

Official website

Training installations of the United States Navy
Military facilities in San Diego County, California
Mountain warfare training installations
La Posta
Laguna Mountains